Actinoplaca is a genus of fungi within the Gomphillaceae family.

References

Ostropales
Lichen genera
Ostropales genera
Taxa named by Johannes Müller Argoviensis